Kirk W. B. Wagar (born July 13, 1969) is a former United States Ambassador to Singapore. He was sworn in as Ambassador on September 4, 2013. Following the inauguration of President Donald Trump, Wagar left his post as Ambassador on 20 January 2017.

References

External links

1969 births
Ambassadors of the United States to Singapore
Living people
People from Perth County, Ontario
Place of birth missing (living people)
Roberts Wesleyan University alumni
University of Miami School of Law alumni
Canadian emigrants to the United States